Yakov Abramovich Chubin also known as Yakov Shub, (born Mstsislaw, Mogilev Governorate, 1893 – died Moscow, November 1956) served as the seventh first secretary of the Communist Party of the Turkmen SSR.

His term began on 17 April 1937, following the resignation of Yakov Popok. He was replaced in February 1939 by Mikhail Fonin. In 1920 Chubin served as the Communist party leader of the Chernigov Governorate.

External links 
 Rulers of Soviet Republics
 Profile at handbook for the history of Communist Party

1893 births
1956 deaths
People from Mstsislaw
People from Mstislavsky Uyezd
Belarusian communists 
Party leaders of the Soviet Union
Communist Party of Turkmenistan politicians
First convocation members of the Supreme Soviet of the Soviet Union